Love, Death & Robots (stylized as LOVE DEATH + R⬮BOTS, and represented in emoji form as ❤️❌🤖) is an adult animated anthology streaming television series created by Tim Miller and streaming on Netflix. Although the series is produced by Blur Studio, individual episodes are produced by different animation studios from a range of countries and explore diverse genres, particularly comedy, horror, science fiction, and fantasy. Each episode is connected to one or more of the three titular concepts. Miller serves as the showrunner and producer alongside Joshua Donen, David Fincher, and Jennifer Miller; most episodes are written by Philip Gelatt, mostly adapting written works.

The series is a re-imagining of Fincher and Miller's long in-development reboot of the 1981 animated science fiction film Heavy Metal, which was originally planned to follow the feature length format of the original film but one that could be better adapted for the new generation. The project however was in development hell for eleven years, until Netflix agreed to be the distributor of the project but instead of a film it would be released as a television series. The series premiered on March 15, 2019, with 18 episodes under 20 minutes long. In April 2020, ahead of the second-season premiere, Netflix renewed the series for an eight-episode third season. Season three was released on May 20, 2022, with nine episodes, one of which was a sequel to the season one short "Three Robots". In August 2022, the series was renewed for a fourth season.

The show has received acclaim from critics, with praise for each episode's animation style, creativity, diverse storylines, and themes. The show has won several accolades from the Primetime Creative Arts Emmy Awards.

Premise 
The animated series consists of stand-alone episodes, all under 22 minutes long, and produced by different casts and crews, though some episodes may share certain crew members. The series title refers to each episode's thematic connection to the three aforementioned subjects, though not every episode contains all three elements.

Episodes

Volume I (2019)
Episode numbers reflect Netflix's original ordering. This ordering has since been changed by Netflix.

Volume II (2021)

Volume III (2022)

Production

Development

The project evolved from a late 2000s meeting whereby David Fincher and Tim Miller decided to make a remake of the 1981 film Heavy Metal. Announced in 2008, the project was to be produced by Paramount Pictures although Fincher and Miller had trouble getting the funding necessary for the project. The project was originally intended to be a film with a budget of around $50 million, with several directors involved with each one directing different short segments and Blur Studio handling the animation for the film. The directors lineup included Miller, Fincher, James Cameron, Zack Snyder, Kevin Eastman, Gore Verbinski, Guillermo del Toro, Mark Osborne, Jeff Fowler, and Rob Zombie. The film was expected to have over eight or nine segments and to be rated R like the original Heavy Metal film. On July 14, 2008, however the production for the film stopped due to Paramount Pictures' decision to drop the film. The film was switched to Sony division Columbia Pictures, due to an ongoing fight between the former studio and Fincher during the production of The Curious Case of Benjamin Button. On 2009, Eastman revealed that he reunited with Jack Black to make a comedy segment for the film. The former also revealed that Fincher and Cameron were originally intended to serve as executive producers of the film.

However soon after, the production of the film stalled indefinitely, as no film distributor or production company showed interest in distributing or producing the remake after Paramount Pictures took the decision to no longer distribute the film. It was revealed that the real reason for this is due to several film studios considering the film "too risqué for mainstream audiences." Miller commented that: "David really believes in the project. It's just a matter of time."

In July 2011, it was announced at the Comic-Con that filmmaker Robert Rodriguez had purchased the film rights to Heavy Metal and planned to develop a new animated film at the new Quick Draw Studios. On March 11, 2014, after creating his own television network, El Rey, Rodriguez decided to instead develop the film as a television series. However, Eastman revealed that he sold Heavy Metal and that the deal with Rodriguez was unlikely to stay standing.

Following a long decade to bring the animated anthology, Netflix took interest on the idea and decided to greenlit the series: "Well, David Fincher and I had tried to get a Heavy Metal film made for years and years. I mean, hundreds of meetings. The original movie came out in 1982 and it was very inspirational to a lot of animators who wanted to do adult animation. So when I met David, we wanted to do something together and we said, 'What about doing a new Heavy Metal film?' because he was an animation fan, but the world just was not ready for it at the time. But in the ten years that we did meetings and tried to get the project going, the world came around to see adult animation as viable, and Netflix was the one that was willing to take a chance. And so here we are." The studio gave Fincher and Miller a total freedom to allow them to "breathe life into their vision". The series would be taking the name of Love, Death & Robots instead, and it would consist of 18 episodes ranging from 5 to 15 minutes including a wide range of animation styles, from traditional 2D animation to photo-real 3D CGI. While working in Netflix for the series House of Cards and Mindhunter, Fincher discussed with to break free of the half-hour and hour-long format for the animated series: "We have to get rid of the 22-minute [length of a half-hour show with commercials] and 48-minute [length of an hour-long show with commercials] because there's this Pavlovian response to this segmentation that to me seems anathema to storytelling. You want the story to be as long as it needs to be to be at maximum impact or entertainment value proposition."

According to Miller, after the release of Deadpool, Fincher called Miller saying "OK, so we're going to use your newfound popularity to get our anthology movie made," only to eventually decide, "Fuck the movie stuff, let's just take it to Netflix, because they'll let us do whatever we want."

On August 12, 2022, Netflix renewed the series for a fourth season.

Writing 

Screenwriters include co-creator Miller and Philip Gelatt (screenwriter of the film Europa Report), the latter who wrote more of the series' episodes than anyone. Many of the short films are short story adaptations, including sixteen of the eighteen in the first season (most of which are adapted by Gelatt). Initially this was not planned, with the duo envisioning a variety of methods by which they would have developed the series. Miller originally suggested a longer list of stories that he wanted to adapt. Miller primarily wrote outlines and drafts for each short and allowed for scripts to be changed as studios saw fit in order to aid the production. Authors who have had their work adapted include Harlan Ellison, J. G. Ballard, Alastair Reynolds, Joe R. Lansdale, Neal Asher, Michael Swanwick, and John Scalzi, who also adapted several of his stories into scripts himself (except some of which are adapted by Gelatt). Miller in an interview revealed that they are free to choose the story they want, but admits wanting to get the storyline of the episode right in order to give them their original flash of brilliance to a story that would not exist if it were not for the authors having ideas. The third season includes more varied screenwriters with Philip Gelatt only writing four episodes of nine. Filmmaker Jennifer Yuh Nelson and Miller revealed that they chose to involve more screenwriters due to busying schedules of Gelatt. However, they also revealed that the writers managed to keep the episodes original to the short stories to make them more like them and ensure that they work.

For the production of the second season, Miller revealed that they changed supervisors to offer a different perspective from the previous season. When Nelson was recruited she convinced the crew including Miller to introduce stories that the latter never thought that would be introduced for the show. To bring the different nature of each episode for the series, the crew worked with different creators and companies to get the different styles for each episode. Unlike the first season that contained 18 episodes, the second season is shorter than the previous one having only released eight episodes. Miller confessed that it was originally meant to get the same amount of episodes like the previous one, however Netflix asked them to shorten it in order to release it sooner in the streaming service, with the remaining episodes being released as part of the third season. Another factor to consider is the COVID-19 pandemic that affected the production of the show which caused the production to be suspended, which would lead the crew to take the decision of making the second season shorter in order to avoid more delays.

Animation 
While Blur Studio is in charge of producing the series, it also was in charge of animating a few episodes for the show. As each episode has a different animation style, the visual effect supervisor for the series revealed that they contacted different studios: "We've been competing against some of these companies for years and admire them greatly. It was thrilling to bring everyone together and let them apply their unique visions to these shorts. It was here where all the creative freedom really paid off." The episodes produced by Blur Studio contain a 3D video game animation style, while also approaching the hand painted one. Tim Miller revealed that for the each different stories, the crew approached certain studios for the specific stories to ensure what episode fit better with the animation style.

For the remaining thirteen episodes, several animation studios were involved - Unit Image, Red Dog Culture House, Able & Baker, Axis Studios, Platige Image, Atomic Fiction, Sony Pictures Imageworks, Passion Animation Studios, Elena Volk's Independent Studio, Blow Studio, Pinkman.TV, Studio La Cachette, Sun Creature Studio, and Digic Pictures. For the episode of "The Witness", the director of the episode Alberto Mielgo used a "never-before-seen aesthetic" to capture the realistic vibe, which lead to several discussions over if it was used motion capture for the streets and building. However, Mielgo confirmed that it was all animated and that it was not easy to do as they needed to keep the characters moving from scratch by using a software that was not used before.

For the following seasons, some of the returning studios besides Blur Studio were Passion Animation Studios, Pinkman.TV, Unit Image, Axis Studios, Blow Studio, and Sony Pictures Imageworks. The series also involved new studios with Atoll Studio and Blink Industries joining the second season, while Polygon Pictures, Buck, and Titmouse joined the third season.

Release 
Netflix released the first trailer for the series on February 14, 2019; the trailer featured Matt Green's industrial hardcore remix of AMBASSADOR21's "We Are Legion". The episodes of the show are displayed in different orders to different users, which differ from how most shows are displayed on the service. The first season consisting of eighteen standalone episodes, was released worldwide on Netflix on March 15, 2019. In response to an accusation that the episode order was based on the streaming company's perception of a user's sexual orientation, Netflix responded that there were four unique episode orders, released to users at random. On April 19, 2021, Netflix released the teaser trailer for the second season; it featured Colin Stetson's track "Reborn" from the Hereditary film soundtrack. The eight episodes of the second season were released on May 14, 2021; four days earlier Netflix released a 45-second long Red Band trailer of the series. On April 19, 2022, a teaser trailer for the third season was released which featured footage from previous seasons of the series as well as footage from other The Crown and The Queen's Gambit also distributed by Netflix. Another two trailers were released on May which featured footage from the shorts for the upcoming season and confirmed that there would be nine episodes instead of eight. The official trailer was released on May 9, 2022, while the final trailer was released just four days before the volume 3 premiere. On May 18, 2022, Netflix released the premiere episode "Three Robots: Exit Strategies" for free on their YouTube channel while the entire third season was released on May 20.

Reception

Volume I
For the first volume, review aggregator Rotten Tomatoes compiled 43 critic reviews and identified 77% as positive, with an average rating of 7.03/10. The website's critical consensus reads, "This animated anthology has enough creative Death to satisfy cyberpunk aficionados who Love their Robots to have some Heavy Metal influence, but the series' lofty ambitions are often undercut by a preoccupation with gore and titillation." Metacritic sampled 4 reviews from mainstream critics and calculated a weighted average score of 65/100, indicating "generally favorable reviews".

Writing in The Daily Beast, Nick Schager described the series as "Black Mirror for the ADD-addled video game crowd" and praised the show for its "diverse affair rife with violence, humor, and a healthy dose of sensuality". Peter Rubin of Wired magazine praised the show and its boundary-pushing nature, saying that "sometimes, you just want to see Adolf Hitler suffocated by a giant mound of gelatin". Rubin further voiced frustration with the seemingly "endless parade of stoic supermen and the women who deceive or escape them", noting that at times it seems as though Fincher and Miller have aimed the show at a "particularly retrograde subset of genre fans". In a more negative review, Ben Travers of IndieWire described the episodes as "too often hyper-masculine and half-baked" and gave the series a C grade, though the review was based on only 6 of the 18 episodes. Abby Robinson of Digital Spy called the series problematic in its portrayal of women as primarily sexual objects and victims of trauma, labeling it as "firmly rooted in the past".

Volume II
The second volume has an 80% rating from 15 reviews on Rotten Tomatoes, with an average rating of 6.70/10. The website's critical consensus reads, "The quality of shorts can be uneven, but Love, Death + Robots''' sophomore volume is a well-oiled machine of creativity." Matt Fowler of IGN said the season needed a higher episode count, "even though its first season had too many. A shorter catalog is probably best here since this year's batch of stories features some repeating themes. That being said, the series continues to be an enjoyable thought-provoking buffet of animated wonders and wickedness". Steve Green of IndieWire praised the season's quality though he was critical over the shorter amount of episodes, "The show remains an anthology, but look hard enough and you'll see at least one hint that these shorts might not be occupying wholly distinct universes after all." Petrana Radulovic from Polygon called the second season less violent and more mature than its predecessor, "That isn't the only difference between seasons, however. Objectively, the shorts in volume 2 are less edgy and violent, trading in gratuitous nudity and gore for poignant storytelling. It's more mature this time around and less messed-up, which makes for stronger viewing."

Volume III
The third volume holds a 100% rating from 16 reviews on Rotten Tomatoes, with an average rating of 8/10, the website's critical consensus stating, "A concise collection of memorable cybernetic fables, Love, Death + Robots' third installment is its most well-balanced yet." Writing for The Verge, Andrew Webster called volume III "arguably the strongest collection yet" praising the stories and various animation styles used in each short. Johhny Loftus from Decider praised the season for its visuals and exploration of real life topics, "Love, Death & Robots keeps the run time tight and visual pizzazz expansive as it explores its titular topics in relation to society and ourselves. And oh yeah, swear words." Tara Bennet from IGN'' considered that the stories for each episode weren't strong enough as the craftmanship though she praised the animation, "Love, Death and Robots Vol. 3 is the least accessible of the three seasons, especially if you aren't interested in an overabundance of gory violence. While there are some impressive examples of CG animation, the craftsmanship is mostly stronger than the stories featured."

Accolades

Notes

References

External links
 
 

2010s American adult animated television series
2020s American adult animated television series
2010s American anthology television series
2010s American black comedy television series
2010s American comic science fiction television series
2010s American horror comedy television series
2010s American surreal comedy television series
2019 American television series debuts
2020s American anthology television series
2020s American black comedy television series
2020s American comic science fiction television series
2020s American horror comedy television series
2020s American surreal comedy television series
American adult animated comedy television series
American adult animated fantasy television series
American adult animated horror television series
American adult animated science fiction television series
American adult animation anthology series
American adult computer-animated television series
American animated science fantasy television series
American comic science fiction television series
American television series with live action and animation
Animated television series about robots
Animated television series by Netflix
Annie Award winners
Emmy Award-winning programs
English-language Netflix original programming
Science fiction anthology television series